Geiersberg (Spessart), also named Breitsol is a hill in the Spessart range in Bavaria, Germany. It is the highest elevation of the Spessart.

Hills of Bavaria
Hills of the Spessart